Verena Carmen Rehm (born 14 May 1984) is a German musician best known as the backing vocalist and pianist of the Eurodance dance group Groove Coverage. She has many song writing credits both within and outside the group and also sings for many other German dance acts.

Early life 
After attending kindergarten, Rehm discovered her passion for music. In her autobiography on the Suprime Records website, she states that her interest began with her father's old piano, which led Verena to begin piano lessons. At 14, she joined the cover band Querbeet. She spent 4 years with them as their lead singer, also playing the keyboard.

Suprime Records and Groove Coverage 
At the age of 18, Rehm was approached by Axel Konrad and Ole Wierk, who asked her to join the team at Suprime Records. After debating against herself for a while, she accepted. Rehm, along with Markus Shaffarzyk (DJ Novus), was one of the faces for Groove Coverage when they first started, even though she was not the lead singer. This was because lead singer Mell was pregnant and could not travel to the locations of live gigs, photo shoots, and music video sets.

Rehm has sung lead on a number of songs done by the group including, Lullaby for Love and Rock, and has had solos during the bridge of songs such as Only Love and Because I Love You. She appeared in two of the group's music videos, God is a Girl and The End, although in both of these songs Mell sings the lead while Rehm provides backing vocals. Rehm was the stage performer miming the lyrics to their hit songs while Mell was pregnant. Since then, she has taken on a more behind the scenes or back seat role in the group, while she continues to write songs and record backing vocals she has been absent from video and photo shoots as well as live performances. Rehm was one of the coproducers for the group's 21st Century album.

Other projects 
Rehm sings lead for the song Face 2 Face by Future Trace United, which is a group formed by the most successful DJs in Germany, including Axel Konrad and Special D, both of whom Rehm has worked with separately. Working with Special D on his album Reckless, Rehm wrote and provided lead vocals for the song Keep The Faith. Rehm also works frequently with Konrad, the Suprime Records label owner. Konrad operates under many different aliases for his music including Age Pee, Renegade Masterz, and Spring Break. In 2012, Rehm recorded the song My Party with DJane HouseKat and Rameez, although she did not get credit on it for an unknown reason. Nevertheless, she performed My Party live in The Dome 62 along DJane HouseKat and the British rapper Rameez.

Other ventures
Rehm provides vocals for the songs: Hymn, Out of the Dark, When the Rain Begins to Fall, Because of You

Renegade Masterz 
Rehm provides vocals for the songs: Crystal Ship, Nasty Girl

Spring Break 
Rehm provides vocals for the songs: Shut up, Big Bad Love

Fashion Music 
Rehm runs a music school called Fashion Music, where she teaches students singing, piano and the art of music composition.

External links 
 Discogs Profile

Groove Coverage
1984 births
Living people
German songwriters
German women singers
German singer-songwriters
German pianists
German women pianists
German keyboardists
People from Neuburg an der Donau